The Special Military Exemplary Band of the Honor Guard is a special military unit that performs military music for the guard of honor of the Russian Armed Forces that greets foreign government delegations, as well as provide musical accompaniment for national events. It is a branch of the Military Band Service of the Armed Forces of Russia. The band was created in the fall of 1956 by order of the Soviet Government, having performed in the welcoming ceremonies of hundreds heads of state and has played its music at many memorials in the country.

The band forms part of the 3rd Honor Guard Battalion, 154th Preobrazhensky Independent Commandant's Regiment.

Directors of the band 

 Colonel Georgiy Nikolaev (1956–1968)
 Lieutenant Colonel Nikolai Zubarevich (1968–1972)
 Colonel Boris Dyldin (1972–1988)
 Colonel Anatoliy Prihodchenko (1989–1993)
 Colonel Sergey Gorev (1993–1998)
 Colonel Eduard Nikolaev (1998–2003)
 Colonel Mikhail Titov (2003–2007)
 Lieutenant Colonel Igor Pahomov (2008–2009)
 Major Konstantin Petrovich (2009–2015)
 Major Pavel Gernets (2015–present)

Brief history 

In one of the detachments of the Moscow Cheka, a special musical platoon was created to provide cultural activities for troops. The band was officially organized in the spring of 1940 at the Moscow Garrison. Three years later, the group was given the title of Exemplary Band of the 236th Regiment of the 36th NKVD Division. Since July 1951, the band has worked with ceremonial services in the Soviet Army, including the  Dzerzhinsky 1st Motorized Rifle Division of the Ministry of Internal Affairs. On November 29, 1956, the Council of Ministers of the USSR ordered the band begin its existence as the Exemplary Military Band of the Guard of Honor. Since 1999, the band has been known and operated under its current name. It is best known for playing at the welcoming ceremony of Yuri Gagarin, the 1980 Summer Olympics, the Yalta and Potsdam Conferences and the visit of Kim Il Sung to Vladivostok. It serves as a musical unit during the wreath laying ceremony at the Tomb of the Unknown Soldier in Moscow's Alexander Garden.

Gallery

Common ceremonial Music

Links 
 Военный образцовый оркестр почётного караула.

References 

Russian military bands